R27 may refer to:

Missiles 
 R-27 (air-to-air missile), a Soviet air-to-air missile
 R-27 Zyb, a Soviet submarine-launched ballistic missile

Roads 
 R-27 regional road (Montenegro)
 R27 (South Africa)

Other uses 
 R27 (New York City Subway car)
 BMW R27, a motorcycle 
 HMA R.27, a rigid airship of the Royal Air Force
 , a destroyer of the Royal Navy
 R27: Very toxic in contact with skin, a risk phrase
 Renault R27, a Formula One racing car
 Rubik R-27 Kópé, a Hungarian training glider
 , a submarine of the United States Navy